"Lay a garland" is a popular English poem from the play The Maid's Tragedy (Act II, Scene I) written in 1608-11. The poem was famously set to music by Robert Lucas de Pearsall on 4 June 1840, scored for SSAATTBB in Eb. In 1854, Pearsall produced a contrafactum of Lay a Garland, to the Latin text Tu es Petrus, dedicating it to the first bishop of St Gallen, John Peter. This is more often performed by choirs in a liturgical setting, as the original words for the music are more appropriate to a secular occasion.

Lyrics

The song is sung by Aspasia where her betrothed is forced into a marriage of convenience to the king's mistress. The original words are as follows:
Lay a garland on my hearse
of the dismal yew.
Maidens, willow branches wear, 
say I died true. 
My love was false, but I was firm
from my hour of birth.
Upon my buried body lie
lightly, gentle earth.

However Pearsall's music is set to these adapted words changed from first to third person
Lay a garland on her hearse
of dismal yew.
Maidens, willow branches wear, 
say she died true. 
Her love was false, but she was firm
Upon her buried body lie
lightly, thou gentle earth.

I: These words were present in the original poem by Beaumont and Fletcher but omitted in the composition
II: Word was added to the into the composition.

References

Choral compositions